Paul Requadt (23 January 1902 – 17 July 1983) was a German Germanist.

Life 
Born in Twistringen, from 1920 to 1926 Requadt studied law in Göttingen, Heidelberg, Munich and Cologne before switching to German studies, history, philosophy and sociology.

Requadt died in Mainz at the age of 81.

Publications 
 Johannes von Müller und der Frühhistorismus. Munich 1929, .
 Beethoven
 Die Bildersprache der deutschen Italiendichtung. Von Goethe bis Benn. Bern 1962, .
 Lichtenberg. Stuttgart 1964, .
 Bildlichkeit der Dichtung. Aufsätze zur deutschen Literatur vom 18. bis 20. Jahrhundert. Munich 1974, .

References

External links 
 gutenberg-biographics.ub.uni-mainz.de

Nazi Party members
Germanists
Academic staff of Johannes Gutenberg University Mainz
1902 births
1983 deaths
People from Diepholz (district)